Punch buggy (also called  slug bug or punch dub) is a car game generally played by children in which participants violently punch each other on the arm upon first sight of a Volkswagen Beetle while calling out "Punch buggy!" in reference to the Beetle's nickname, the Bug.

Rules
	
The first player to spot a particular Volkswagen Beetle calls out "Punch buggy!" and violently punches another player. Once a car has been spotted and called out it cannot be used by another player. The game can be played for points: spotting a Beetle earns the player a point, but making an incorrect call means that they lose a point.
	
The color of the Beetle is sometimes stated when it is called.
	
In some versions, a player must shout "No punch backs!" after each call. If they forget to do so, they may be immediately punched back by the player that they punched.

History
Most references about the game originate from unofficial sources and personal accounts from players. It apparently has existed since the Volkswagen's peak popularity in the 1960s.

Volkswagen ran a 2009 advertising campaign calling the game "Punch Dub", with a fictional backstory of its inventor, Sluggy Patterson. The campaign claimed that the game was started "over 50 years ago", though this is a humorous historical fiction created by the ad agency Deutsch Inc.

In 2010, Volkswagen referenced the game in a Super Bowl commercial, where, at the end, somehow, blind musician Stevie Wonder punched comedian Tracy Morgan after "spotting" a red bug, causing Morgan to ask him how he did that, which Wonder does not answer. The game was also referenced in an episode of The Simpsons ("Bart vs. Lisa vs. the Third Grade") and a scene in the Disney film Lilo & Stitch.

Variants

Some variations consider the 1998-2010 Beetle and 2011-2019 Beetle invalid for game purposes, but as older models become rarer, variations may choose to include the new Beetles. Others allow "classic" Beetles to count for two punches.

In Brazil, a popular version of the game is played when a blue Volkswagen Beetle is seen. The first individual to notice it has to scream 'Fusca Azul', which stands for 'Blue Beetle', while others close their arms around their breasts and say 'Fechei' (I closed it), and the person who forgets or refuses to say 'Fechei' may have their arm punched as a punishment. A Mexican variant exists, but with yellow Beetles rather than blue ones. It is stated that those rare yellow-colored Beetles could bring good luck. 

One author suggests similar games with station wagons, convertibles, trucks and buses.

See also

References

American cultural conventions
Car games
Children's games
Volkswagen Beetle